WBHF AM 1450 (also on FM translator W262CD  100.3 FM) is a radio station founded in 1946 and broadcasting a nostalgic music radio format. Licensed to Cartersville, Georgia, United States, it serves the far northwest Atlanta area. The station is currently owned by the non-profit Anverse, Inc. and features  music programming from America's Best Music, news from Fox News Radio and the Georgia News Network and is an affiliate of the Atlanta Braves Radio Network. The station also broadcasts many local government meetings, election debates, live talk shows, holiday specials and local sports games.

It also has several local shows including Bartow's Morning News weekdays, a Wednesday sports show Three & Out and Bartow Sports Zone on Fridays.
Saturday morning local programming includes Waking Up with Alan and the geek, retro and nostalgia talk show B.K. on the Air with Barry King.

The station has won several awards from the Georgia Association of Broadcasters.
WBHF also streams on their website and on the Tunein and Radio Garden apps.

External links

BHF
Radio stations established in 1989